Ronald Ellis Savage (22 April 1917 – 15 January 1974) was an Australian rules footballer who played for Carlton in the Victorian Football League (VFL).

Family
The son of unmarried mother Violet Irene Ellis (1891–1919), Ronald Ellis was born at Carlton on 22 April 1917. Shortly after his birth he was adopted by Joseph William Savage (1874–1952) and Annie Savage, nee Harrison, and took the name Ronald Ellis Savage.

Football
Savage made his debut for the Carlton Football Club in round 14 of the 1938 season. He left the club after winning the best and fairest award in 1945.

He moved Tasmania for a few years and played or coached Hobart in the Tasmanian Football League (1946–47), Franklin in the Huon Football Association in 1948, and then City (1949–50) and Longford (1951–52) in the Northern Tasmanian Football Association. Savage then returned to Victoria to coach the Red Cliffs Football Club.

War service
In the middle of his time at Carlton, Savage enlisted to serve in the Australian Army during World War II.

Death
Ronald Ellis Savage died at Mooroopna on 15 January 1974 and was cremated at Fawkner Memorial Park.

External links

 Ron Savage at Blueseum

Notes

1917 births
1974 deaths
Carlton Football Club players
Carlton Football Club Premiership players
John Nicholls Medal winners
Hobart Football Club coaches
Australian rules footballers from Melbourne
Hobart Football Club players
City-South Football Club players
City-South Football Club coaches
Longford Football Club players
One-time VFL/AFL Premiership players
People from Carlton, Victoria
Australian Army personnel of World War II
Military personnel from Melbourne